Lee Chae-eun is a South Korean actress. She is known for her roles in dramas such as One Mom and Three Dads, 100% Era, Grand Prince and All of Us Are Dead. She also appeared in movies Detective K: Secret of the Lost Island, The Mimic, The Last Princess and Steel Rain.

Biography and career 
She was born on August 13, 2004 in South Korea. Lee Chae-eun made her debut as a child actress in 2008 and joined Youborn Company. She appeared in several dramas One Mom and Three Dads, 100% Era, Grand Prince and All of Us Are Dead. She completed her studies from Shinseo High School. She also appeared in a number of films Detective K: Secret of the Virtuous Widow, Detective K: Secret of the Virtuous Widow, Hot Young Bloods, Detective K: Secret of the Lost Island, The Mimic and Steel Rain.

Filmography

Television series

Film

References

External links 
 

2004 births
Living people
21st-century South Korean actresses
South Korean television actresses
South Korean film actresses